Faust and Marguerite is a romantic opera in three acts, dating from 1855, based on the Faust legend.  The score was composed by Meyer Lutz.  The libretto was written by Henri Drayton based on the Johann Wolfgang von Goethe play Faust. The 1900 film Faust and Marguerite is an adaptation of the play. It was directed by Edwin S. Porter, three years before he directed The Great Train Robbery.

Sources

English-language operas
1855 operas
Operas
Works based on Goethe's Faust
Operas by Meyer Lutz
Operas based on plays
Operas based on works by Johann Wolfgang von Goethe